Ukraine participated at the 2018 Summer Youth Olympics in Buenos Aires, Argentina from 6 October to 18 October 2018.

Mykhaylo Kokhan and Yaroslava Mahuchikh (both - athletics), Oleh Serbin and Sofiya Lyskun (both - diving), Khrystyna Pohranychna (rhythmic gymnastics), Denys Kesil and Ihor Troianovskyi (both - swimming) represented Ukraine at the 2020 Summer Olympics. Yaroslava Mahuchikh won bronze at the 2020 Summer Olympics.

Medalists

Mixed-NOCs events

Archery

Ukraine qualified two archers based on its performance at the 2017 World Archery Youth Championships.

Individual

Team

Athletics

Ukraine qualified 13 athletes: 4 boys and 9 girls.  

Boys
Track & road events

Field events

Girls
Track & road events

Field events

Badminton

Ukraine qualified one player based on the Badminton Junior World Rankings.

Singles

Team

Basketball

Ukraine qualified a boys' and girls' team based on the U18 3x3 National Federation Ranking.

 Boys' tournament - 1 team of 4 athletes
 Girls' tournament - 1 team of 4 athletes

Competition results
Girls' shoot-out contest

Girls' shoot-out contest

Boys' tournament

Preliminary round
Pool B

Knockout round
Quarterfinals

Semifinals

Third place game

Girls' tournament

Preliminary round
Pool B

Knockout round
Quarterfinals

Boxing

Boys

Canoeing

Ukraine qualified two boats based on its performance at the 2018 World Qualification Event.

 Boys' C1 - 1 boat
 Girls' C1 - 1 boat

Boys

Girls

Cycling

Ukraine qualified to compete in girls' combined team.

 Girls' combined team - 1 team of 2 athletes

Combined team

Diving

Fencing

Girls

Mixed

Gymnastics

Acrobatic

Ukraine qualified a mixed pair based on its performance at the 2018 Acrobatic Gymnastics World Championship.
 Mixed pair - 1 team of 2 athletes

Mixed pair

Artistic

Ukraine qualified two gymnasts based on its performance at the 2018 European Junior Championship.

 Boys' artistic individual all-around - 1 quota
 Girls' artistic individual all-around - 1 quota

Boys
Qualification

All-around

Apparatus finals

Girls
Qualification

All-around

Apparatus finals

Rhythmic

Ukraine qualified one rhythmic gymnast based on its performance at the European qualification event.

 Girls' rhythmic individual all-around - 1 quota

All-around

Mixed multi-discipline team

Judo

Individual

Team

Karate

Ukraine qualified one athlete based on its performance at one of the Karate Qualification Tournaments.

 Boys' -68 kg - Robert Shyroian

Modern pentathlon

Individual

Mixed

Rowing

Ukraine qualified one boat based on its performance at the 2018 European Rowing Junior Championships.

 Boys' single sculls - 1 boat

Single sculls

Shooting

Ukraine qualified one sport shooter based on its performance at the 2018 European Championships. 

 Boys' 10m Air Pistol - 1 quota

Individual

Mixed

Sport climbing

Boys

Swimming

Boys

Girls

Taekwondo

Tennis

Singles

Doubles

Weightlifting

Ukraine qualified two athletes based on its performance at the 2017 World Youth Championships.

 Boys' events - 1 quota
 Girls' events - 1 quota

On 30 September 2017, Ukraine was handed a one-year ban from the IWF for doping violations which was in effect til mid-October. Therefore, Ukrainian athletes were unable to compete in Buenos Aires.

Wrestling

Key:
  – Victory by Fall
  – Without any points scored by the opponent
  – With point(s) scored by the opponent
  – Without any points scored by the opponent
  – With point(s) scored by the opponent

References

External links
 Ukrainian Team, published by the National Olympic Committee of Ukraine

2018 in Ukrainian sport
Nations at the 2018 Summer Youth Olympics
2018